Lac du Ballon is a reservoir in Haut-Rhin, France situated in a side valley of florival, on the slope of Grand Ballon mountain. At an elevation of 988 m, its surface area is 0.08 km².

The small glacial lake was enlarged by a dam on the moraine already in the 16th century. In 1699, Vauban had it refurbished to supply canals for the building of Neuf-Brisach. The remainders of this dam were destroyed by flooding in 1740 and 1778.

In 1869, manufacturers dug a gallery to the lake bottom to increase the usable water height. Until 1955, the rock ground became leaky.

1966–1968 the lake was tightened, the dam heightened again, with a flood spillway at the left end. The old gallery was backfilled, a new bottom outlet with a valve tower built.
In 2000, the dam and the lake shore were masoned, the dam top fixed with concrete.

The lake provides fresh water supply and flood protection for the Lauch valley and the town of Guebwiller.

External links 

Ballon
Ballon
Ballon
R Lac du Ballon